The Pacific Missile Range Facility, Barking Sands  is a U.S. naval facility and airport located five nautical miles (9 km) northwest of the central business district of Kekaha, in Kauai County, Hawaii, United States.

PMRF is the world's largest instrumented, multi-dimensional testing and training missile range. The US military and its  contractors favor its relative isolation, ideal year-round tropical climate and encroachment-free environment (see "PMRF Agriculture Preservation Initiative" below). It is the only range in the world where submarines, surface ships, aircraft and space vehicles can operate and be tracked simultaneously.

The base includes a  runway with operations and maintenance facilities. It has roughly 70 housing units and various recreational facilities for those who can access the base.

The base has support facilities at Port Allen, Makaha Ridge, and Koke'e State Park. The base also uses a portion of the nearby island of Niihau for a remotely operated APS-134 surveillance radar, an  Test Vehicle Recovery Site, the Perch Electronic Warfare site, multiple EW Portable Simulator sites, and a Helicopter Terrain Flight training course.

History
In 1921, the land area known as the Barking Sands was acquired by the Kekaha Sugar Company and became a runway for private planes. In 1928 Charles Kingsford Smith, a record-setting Australian aviator, took off with his four-man crew from a sandy runway here to fly non-stop to Fiji. They had arrived in Hawaii at Wheeler Army Airfield, but left from Barking Sands as Wheeler was not long enough to take off with their heavy load. The U.S. Army acquired the land in 1940, named it Mana Airport, and paved the runway. Private airlines frequently utilized the airport, and World War II incurred a great deal of military flight operations. The base was officially designated Bonham Air Force Base in 1954. U.S. Navy operations at Bonham began in 1956, with testing of the Regulus I missile. In 1958, the Pacific Missile Range Facility was established to support the growing demand of the Navy at Bonham. In 1964, the Pacific Missile Range Facility and Bonham was transferred to the Navy, becoming Pacific Missile Range Facility, Barking Sands.

Missile tests

In 1962, the U.S. military conducted the Frigate Bird Test of the Operation Dominic program near PMRF.

The Navy is currently using PMRF to test "hit to kill" technology using direct collision of the anti-ballistic missile with its target. This destroys the target by using only kinetic energy from the force of the collision. The two Missile Defense Agency programs that currently utilize the range at PMRF are the Navy's Aegis Ballistic Missile Defense System and the Army's Terminal High Altitude Area Defense System, or THAAD. The THAAD program relocated their testing operations from the White Sands Missile Range in New Mexico and conducted its first demonstration at PMRF on 26 January 2007.

On 27 April 2007, the U.S. military's sea-based missile defense system, the Aegis Ballistic Missile Defense System, showed it could intercept two targets simultaneously when it destroyed a cruise missile and a short-range ballistic missile during a test off the Hawaiian island of Kauai. The test marked eight out of ten times the Missile Defense Agency and U.S. Navy's Aegis missile defense system successfully intercepted its target, but was the first time the system knocked out two targets at the same time.

PMRF Agriculture Preservation Initiative
The Navy is currently working with the State of Hawaii and Kauai County to ensure the long-term viability of PMRF. For many decades, the land adjacent to PMRF was used for sugarcane fields, which was wholly compatible with operations at PMRF. Since Kekaha Sugar's closure, the Navy has become wary of "encroachment", incompatible developments, that might occur on the land next to the base. In order to ensure that PMRF can continue to safely conduct important research and training operations in the future, the Navy and some citizens of Kauai are seeking to permanently preserve the land adjacent to PMRF for agricultural purposes.

Operational deployment of THAAD
When North Korea threatened to launch Taepodong-2 ICBMs toward Hawaii in 2009, the US temporarily deployed a THAAD missile unit to the facility.

Range Programs 
The range hosted the following programs:

 Able III & IV 
 ADTS 
 Atlas
 Bullpup (A) & (B) 
 Caleb Satellite
 Centaur
 Composite Radiation Satellite 
 Corvus I
 Courier 
 Discoverer 
 Dyna-Soar
 Eagle
 Falcon
 Hawk 
 Hummingbird
 Hydra 
 Hyperjet 
 Jaguar (Probe) 
 Mach 2 Expendable Target 
 Mach 2 Recoverable Target 
 Mercury 
 Midas 
 Minuteman
 MORT (Fleet Training) 
 NERV
 Nike-Zeus
 NORT (Fleet Training)  
 Ozarc 
 Pershing
 Phoenix
 Regulus I
 Rella 
 Samos-Atlas
 Scout
 Sergeant
 Sidewinder
 Sparrow III
 Sunflare
 Talos
 Tartar
 Tepee
 Terrier I
 Thor
 Tiros
 Titan
 Tophat
 Transit 
 Tumbleweed 
 Typhon

See also

 Eastern Test Range
 WWVH, a time signal radio station on the grounds of the PMRF
 Hawaii World War II Army Airfields
List of United States Navy airfields

Notes

References

External links
 Pacific Missile Range Facility Barking Sands, official website
 PMRF Agriculture Preservation Initiative
 NMB Barking Sands Installation Overview at NavyUSA.org
 Pacific Missile Range Facility (PMRF) / NS Barking Sands at GlobalSecurity.org
 

Airfields of the United States Army Air Forces in Hawaii
Airports in Hawaii
Buildings and structures in Kauai County, Hawaii
Guided missiles
Kauai
Missile defense
Rocket launch sites in the United States
Installations of the United States Navy in Hawaii
Military airbases established in 1940
1940 establishments in Hawaii